Pietro Bodoni (died 1509) was a Roman Catholic prelate who served as Bishop of Terni (1506–1509).

Biography
On 29 July 1506, Pietro Bodoni was appointed by Pope Julius II as Bishop of Terni.
He served as Bishop of Terni until his death in 1509.

See also 
Catholic Church in Italy

References

External links and additional sources
 (for Chronology of Bishops) 
 (for Chronology of Bishops) 

16th-century Italian Roman Catholic bishops
1509 deaths
Bishops appointed by Pope Julius II